Ixtlan may refer to:

Ixtlán, Michoacan, Mexico
Ixtlán del Río, Nayarit, Mexico
Ixtlán del Rio (archaeological site)
Ixtlán de los Hervores, Michoacán, Mexico
Ixtlán de Juárez, Oaxaca, Mexico
Ixtlán District, Oaxaca, Mexico
Radio Ixtlan, a 2004 record by the music group Ewigkeit

See also
 Journey to Ixtlan, a book by Carlos Castaneda